is a 1978 Japanese sports film directed by Yōichi Higashi.

Awards and nominations
3rd Hochi Film Award
 Won: Best Film

References

External links

1978 films
Films directed by Yōichi Higashi
1970s Japanese-language films
Best Film Kinema Junpo Award winners
1970s Japanese films